Rajalakshmi Engineering College is a  Private engineering college located at Thandalam, Sriperumbudur near Chennai, Tamil Nadu, India. The college was established in 1997 by the Rajalakshmi Educational Trust, Rajalakshmi Institutions.

Accreditations
It is approved and accredited by the National Board of Accreditation (NBA)

The college is also accredited by companies like Tata Consultancy Services, Cognizant Technology Solutions, WIPRO Trusted Academic Partner and Infosys Campus Connect.
Ashok Leyland recognized the college as a centre of excellence in automotives. IBM named it a "Centre of Excellence for Certified Software Center".

Cooperation with other organisations

It has memoranda with the following industry representatives:

Robert Bosch GmbH to set up a joint certification training centre.
 Aban Group focusing on biofuel from algae.

Rajalakshmi Education Private Limited has entered into an agreement with University of Worcester to jointly offer courses in computing and management.

REC sponsored the Aircel Chennai Open from 2012.

Facilities

The REC library has a collection of 48,100 volumes and periodicals.

Transport 
The college now runs over 101 air-conditioned buses.

Conferences and symposia
In 2013 REC organised an international conference on surface engineering for research and industrial applications, Interfinish SERIA 2013 Asia Pacific.

Rankings

The National Institutional Ranking Framework (NIRF) ranked it 110among engineering colleges in 2021.

Societies and extracurricular activities

 NSS (a community service initiative)

KRIYA

KRIYA is an "entrepreneurship development cell" with the stated aim of conducting research, inspiring students, assist with project development and provide interaction with entrepreneurs and industrialists. The facility is designed by students.

Alumni association

Some alumni have achieved a degree of international recognition.

See also

 Rajalakshmi Institutions
 Rajalakshmi Institute of Technology
 Rajalakshmi School of Architecture

References

External links 

 

Rajalakshmi Institutions
Engineering colleges in Chennai
Nursing schools in India
Colleges affiliated to Anna University
Business schools in Chennai
Educational institutions established in 1997
Private engineering colleges in Tamil Nadu
Academic institutions formerly affiliated with the University of Madras
1997 establishments in Tamil Nadu